Rocket Monkeys is a Canadian animated television series created by Dan Abdo and Jason Patterson for Teletoon. It premiered in Canada on January 10, 2013, and aired its last new episode on November 23, 2016, before entering reruns. The series is produced by Breakthrough Entertainment in association with Hornet Films and Atomic Cartoons. 65 episodes were produced.

The series won several Canadian Screen Awards, including Best Animated Program in both 2015 and 2016.

Plot
Brothers Gus and Wally are monkey astronauts. They're not the brightest or coolest astronauts, but since they are the only ones around, they are called upon to go into space and carry out different kinds of important missions—including battling rogue black holes and vengeful aliens. Other members of the brothers' crew include bossy astrophysicist Dr. Chimpsky, who gives the monkeys their assignments; YAY-OK, a devoted robot that is slightly outdated and is the brothers' only hope to help keep them on course; and Inky, a space octopus and artist who communicates through his ink drawings.

Characters
 Gus Monkey (voiced by Seán Cullen) is Wally's monkey partner and older brother. He wants nothing more than to be a hero, but he can't always put aside his monkey instincts. The closest thing the ship has to a captain, he takes being a GASI cadet very seriously—well, when he feels like it.
 Wally Monkey (voiced by Mark Edwards) is Gus' monkey partner and younger brother, and is considered the smarter of the two. However Poorly-groomed yet somehow adorable, Wally would rather be playing Banana Blasters or organizing his expired pudding collection than jetting off on some crazy expedition. If there's one thing Wally's good at, it's being a monkey—he can howl and fling with the best of them.
 Yay-OK (voiced by David Berni) is Wally and Gus' obsolete robot companion that helps them on their adventures through space. There's nothing this robot wouldn't do for his beloved monkeys—after all, he's programmed that way. He's quite the charmer, too—from the fridge to the blender to the vending machine, there isn't a ladybot on board whose circuits he hasn't made beep a little faster.
 Dr. Chimpsky (voiced by Jamie Watson) is the leader of GASI headquarters. He assigns the Monkeys their highly important missions (which sometimes include getting him more ice when his drink gets too warm) and does his best to keep them on track when they get distracted.
 Inky is a space octopus and an artist who communicates through his incredible ink drawings. Whether he's a member of the crew or just unbearably cute, is anybody's guess. But either way, his artistic talents make him super fun to have around.
 Lord Peel (voiced by Mark McKinney) is the main antagonist of the series, whom the monkeys constantly mistake for a banana. Before the events of the series, he was a noble businessman. But then the Rocket Monkeys began to crave him, and he's been trying to get revenge on them for trying to eat him and especially for forcing him into the dark side.
 Nefarious (voiced by Seán Cullen) is one of the antagonists of the series. He lives in a prison asteroid, which he tries to escape in most episodes.
 SLO-MO (voiced by Teresa Pavlinek) is Nefarious’ robot companion. In some episodes, she cares about YAY-OK a lot.
 Deep Space Dave (also voiced by Seán Cullen) is a superhero who always relies on his fans- the monkeys, of course.

Production and development
The development of the series begins in 2006. The two protagonist monkeys, Gus and Wally, are inspired by the complicity of the two creators of the series, Dan Abdo and Jason Patterson, friends since high school. Jason and Dan did some animation tests and sketches which they showed Michael Feder. Feder, a partner of Hornet Inc, then helped in the development of Rocket Monkeys, under the label of Hornet Films. In 2007, the animation division of their studio closed. 4Kids Entertainment then volunteered to take care of the pre-production of the series from spring 2008.

At the beginning of 2012, production was completed and the animation was taken over by Atomic Cartoons in Vancouver.

Episodes

Broadcast and home media
Rocket Monkeys had been broadcast in Canada on its original channel, Teletoon, since January 10, 2013. The series is available for digital per-episode purchase in Canada, and cannot be purchased in the U.S. in that manner. As of 2021, the series (with the exception of some episodes), can be seen on the completely free streaming service, Tubi.

On February 21, 2013, Nickelodeon announced that they had acquired the broadcast rights to the series, including for the U.S., though its history on that network was marked with several shifts. It premiered on March 4, 2013, but then shifted over to sister network Nicktoons due to low ratings and waning promotion on Nickelodeon, before that network dropped it entirely  in May 2014, leaving it off US airwaves for just over three years. The second season finally premiered in the U.S. on July 3, 2017 as part of the over-the-air KidsClick syndicated children's block and has aired until the block shut down in 2019. In the United Kingdom, it premiered on Nicktoons in 2013 and ended sometime in 2017, but repeats aired from December 2017 to 28 January 2018, and it also aired on CITV. In Southeast Asia, it aired on Disney XD, and in Poland, it aired on Disney XD.

References

2010s Canadian animated television series
2010s Canadian comic science fiction television series
2013 Canadian television series debuts
2016 Canadian television series endings
Canadian children's animated space adventure television series
Canadian children's animated comic science fiction television series
Animated television series about monkeys
Television franchises introduced in 2013
Television series set in outer space
Canadian flash animated television series
English-language television shows
Teletoon original programming
Disney XD original programming
KidsClick